Sofa Mountain is a 2,515-meter (8,251-foot) summit located in Waterton Lakes National Park, in Alberta, Canada. It is part of the Lewis Range which is a subset of the Canadian Rockies, and is the easternmost mountain in the Canadian Rockies, as well as the park. Topographic relief is significant as the north aspect rises over 1,220 meters (4,000 feet) above Middle Waterton Lake in approximately six kilometers (3.7 mi).

History

The mountain was named in 1865 by Kootenay Brown who wrote: "Coming down from the mountain, where we got our first glimpse of the buffalo, we soon reached the prairie shore of a large lake at the further side of which a mountain rose to a sofa-like peak among the clouds. This mountain was afterwards called Sofa Mountain." This mountain's name was officially adopted in 1943 by the Geographical Names Board of Canada.

Geology

Like other mountains in Waterton Lakes National Park, Sofa Mountain is composed of sedimentary rock laid down during the Precambrian to Jurassic periods.

Climate

Based on the Köppen climate classification, Sofa Mountain has an alpine subarctic climate with cold, snowy winters, and mild summers. Temperatures can drop below −20 °C with wind chill factors below −30 °C. Precipitation runoff from Sofa Mountain drains to the Waterton River and Belly River.

See also

 Geology of the Rocky Mountains
Geology of Alberta

References

External links
 Parks Canada web site: Waterton Lakes National Park
 Weather forecast: Sofa Mountain

Two-thousanders of Alberta
Waterton Lakes National Park
Alberta's Rockies